The 2002 Teen Choice Awards ceremony was held on August 19, 2002, at the Universal Amphitheatre, Universal City, California. The awards celebrate the year's achievements in music, film, television, sports, fashion, comedy, video games, and the Internet, and were voted on by viewers living in the US, aged 13 and over through various social media sites. The event had no designated host but Britney Spears and Verne Troyer introduced the show with Nelly, Jennifer Love Hewitt and BBMak as performers. Reese Witherspoon received the Extraordinary Achievement Award.

Performers
Nelly – "Hot in Herre"
Jennifer Love Hewitt – "BareNaked"
BBMak – "Out of My Heart (Into Your Head)"

Presenters

Paula Abdul
Jessica Alba
Tim Allen
Eva Amurri
Pamela Anderson
BBMak
Big Boy
Jack Black
Selma Blair
Alexis Bledel
Nick Cannon
Nick Carter
JC Chasez
Erika Christensen
Simon Cowell
Carmen Electra
Eve
Seth Green
Tom Green
Alyson Hannigan
Tony Hawk
Joshua Jackson
Randy Jackson
Dwayne "The Rock" Johnson
Sam Jones III
Jamie Kennedy
Chris Kirkpatrick
Chris Klein
Kristen Kreuk
Lil' Romeo
Tara Lipinski
Allison Mack
Rose McGowan
Mark McGrath
Frankie Muniz
Nobody's Angel
Apolo Anton Ohno
Jack Osbourne
Kelly Osbourne
Jaime Pressly
The Real World: Chicago cast
Michael Rosenbaum
Susan Sarandon
Seann William Scott
Britney Spears
Jamie Lynn Spears
Mena Suvari
Justin Timberlake
Michelle Trachtenberg
Verne Troyer
Wilmer Valderrama
Tom Welling

Winners and nominees
Winners are listed first and highlighted in bold text.

Movies

Television

Music

Miscellaneous

References

2002 awards
2002 in American music
2002 in California
2000s in Los Angeles
August 2002 events
2002